The United Steel, Paper and Forestry, Rubber, Manufacturing, Energy, Allied Industrial and Service Workers International Union, commonly known as the United Steelworkers (USW), is a general trade union with members across North America. Headquartered in Pittsburgh, the United Steelworkers represents workers in Canada, the Caribbean, and the United States. The United Steelworkers represent workers in a diverse range of industries, including primary and fabricated metals, paper, chemicals, glass, rubber, heavy-duty conveyor belting, tires, transportation, utilities, container industries, pharmaceuticals, call centers and health care.

The United Steelworkers is currently affiliated with the AFL–CIO in the United States and the Canadian Labour Congress (CLC) in Canada as well as several international union federations. On July 2, 2008, the United Steelworkers signed an agreement to merge with the United Kingdom and Ireland–based union Unite to form a new global union entity called Workers Uniting.

The current International President of the United Steelworkers is Tom Conway, who was installed as President after the retirement of Leo Gerard.

Rank-and-file members, as well as representatives, of the United Steelworkers refer to themselves, and are most often referred to, as Steelworkers. The use of the capitalized single word Steelworker or Steelworkers, as opposed to the lowercase two-worded steel worker or steel workers, is also an identifier of those who are part of, or affiliated with, the United Steelworkers International Union rather than being general non-union workers within the steel industry. This distinction is important in North America wherein a vast majority of the steel industry is unionized. For example, some of the most recognizable and largest companies in the business such as United States Steel (USS) and Cleveland-Cliffs, with their combined hourly workforces at facilities in North America being Steelworkers and represented by the USW, including the largest facilities on the continent, like US Steel's Gary Works in Gary, Indiana, Cleveland-Cliffs's Burns Harbor in Burns Harbor, Indiana, Indiana Harbor East and West in Northwest Indiana, and Cleveland Plant in Cleveland, Ohio, all of which are situated on the Great Lakes freshwater system. On the other hand, some steel companies, usually at facilities known as "mini-mills", like Nucor Steel and its facility in Crawfordsville, Indiana, are non-union shops not represented by the United Steelworkers.

Origins and history

The USW was established May 22, 1942, in Cleveland, Ohio, through the Congress of Industrial Organizations (CIO) by a convention of representatives from the Amalgamated Association of Iron, Steel, and Tin Workers and the Steel Workers Organizing Committee, after almost six years of divisive struggles to create a new union of steelworkers. The drive to create this union included such violent incidents as the infamous Memorial Day, 1937, when Chicago policemen supporting the rival American Federation of Labor (AFL) fired on workers outside a Republic Steel mill and killed 10 men.

The founder and first president of the USW, Philip Murray, led the union through its first organizing drives and its first decade, when the workers of USW went on strike several times to win the right to bargain collectively with steel companies.

Significant job actions of the USW include the 1952 steel strike, the steel strike of 1959, the 1974 Elliot Lake miners strike, and the steel strike of 1986.

Growth of the union

The 46,000 members of the Aluminum Workers of America voted to merge with the budding steelworker union that was the USW in June 1944.  Eventually, eight more unions joined the USW as well: the International Union of Mine, Mill and Smelter Workers (1967); the United Stone and Allied Product Workers of America (1971); International Union of District 50, Allied and Technical Workers of the United States and Canada (1972); the Upholsterers International Union of North America (1985); the United Rubber, Cork, Linoleum and Plastic Workers of America (URW) (1995); the Aluminum, Brick and Glass Workers Union (ABG) (1996);  the Canadian Division of the Transportation Communications International Union (1999); and the American Flint Glass Workers' Union (AFGWU) (2003).

In June 2004, the USW announced a merger with the 57,000 member Industrial, Wood and Allied Workers of Canada (IWA Canada), a major Canadian forestry workers union. In 2005 it then announced an even larger merger with the Paper, Allied-Industrial, Chemical and Energy Workers International Union (PACE).  The resulting new union adopted its current name after the PACE merger.

In September 2006, the Independent Oil Workers Union of Aruba, which represents refinery workers on the Caribbean island of Aruba, affiliated with the United Steelworkers, becoming the first USW union local outside of the US (including Puerto Rico and the US Virgin Islands) and Canada.

In April 2007, the USW also merged with the Independent Steelworkers Union, adding 1,150 members at Arcelor-Mittal's Weirton, West Virginia steel mill.

Strategic alliances
In addition to mergers, the USW has also formed strategic alliances with several other unions as well as other groups.  In April 2005, the USW and the Alliance of Canadian Cinema, Television and Radio Artists (ACTRA) announced that they had formed a strategic alliance to take on the globalization of the culture industry and to address a range of common issues.  In July 2006, the USW announced a similar arrangement with the United Transportation Union (UTU), to address common issues in the transportation industry, including the globalization of the industry. In July 2007, the USW inked yet another strategic alliance with the Canadian Region of the Communications Workers of America.

Beyond its affiliations with other unions, in June 2006, the USW announced the formation of a 'Blue-Green Alliance' with the Sierra Club, with the goal of pursuing a joint public policy agenda.

In October 2009, the USW announced a framework for collaboration between US and Canadian Steelworkers with Mondragon Internacional, S.A., the world's largest federation of worker cooperatives.

2008 transoceanic merger
In April 2007, Amicus, then the United Kingdom's second-largest trade union, began discussions with the USW about a possible merger. Amicus subsequently merged with the British Transport and General Workers Union to form the new union Unite.  Unite and the USW continued the merger talks initiated by Amicus.

In May 2008, the unions announced that they were putting the "finishing touches" on the merger, that the merger had been endorsed by Unite officials, and that the USW would discuss the plan at its forthcoming convention in July. Once completed, the new merged entity would represent more than 3 million workers in the United States, the United Kingdom, Canada, Ireland and the Caribbean.  The unions have further announced that the new entity would target further mergers with labor groups in Australia and in the emerging economies of Asia, Latin America and Eastern Europe. On July 2, 2008, USW and Unite leadership formally signed the merger agreement to create the new entity, to be called Workers Uniting.

American politics
In the 2006 election, the USW led a massive political mobilization program that eventually grew to include 350 full-time political organizers in 26 states, a majority of whom were rank and file USW members who took time from work to organize their communities and educate fellow union members. The USW turned out some 5,000 USW volunteers on Election Day, including over 1,000 each in the key states of Pennsylvania and Ohio. Exit polls suggested union families made up 23 percent of the total vote and supported Democratic candidates by a substantial 32 percent margin, 65 percent to 33 percent.  Based on these numbers, the United Steelworkers, in conjunction with the rest of the labor movement, took substantial credit for the eventual Democratic victory.

The USW endorsed Barack Obama's presidential campaign and re-election, Hilary Clinton's presidential campaign, and Joe Biden's presidential campaign.

Canadian politics
The United Steelworkers was a founding partner of the New Democratic Party and continues to be an affiliated union.

Philanthropy
The USW has contributed to various charitable and philanthropic causes since its creation. The USW has enthusiastically supported The Institutes for the Achievement of Human Potential (IAHP), a nonprofit organization that works with brain-injured children. The USW has hosted the IAHP's founder, Glenn Doman, at their annual convention. The USW has also held fundraising events for the Make-A-Wish Foundation and Roswell Park Comprehensive Cancer Center. The USW has consistently stated that such charitable causes are important to its mission.

Presidents
The presidents of the United Steelworkers are:
 Philip Murray, 1942–1952
 David J. McDonald, 1952–1965
 I. W. Abel, 1965–1977
 Lloyd McBride, 1977–1983
 Lynn R. Williams, 1983–1994
 George Becker, 1994–2001
 Leo Gerard, 2001–2019
 Tom Conway, 2019–present

See also

 Arthur Goldberg, general counsel of the USW and later a US Supreme Court associate justice
 Bernard Kleiman, general counsel of USW from 1965 to 1997

References

Further reading
 Bodnar, John (1977). Immigration and Industrialization: Ethnicity in an American Mill Town, 1870-1940.
 Brody, David (1965). Labor in Crisis: The Steel Strike of 1919.
 Caballero, Mary Hull (Spring 2006). "Interview with Leo Gerard", The Heinz Journal.
 Catano, James V. (2001). Ragged Dicks: Masculinity, Steel, and the Rhetoric of the Self-Made Man.
 Early History of the United Steelworkers
Scamehorn, H. Lee (1992). Mill & Mine: The Cf&I in the Twentieth Century. Colorado Steel Company.
 
 
 Warne, Colston E., ed. (1963). The Steel Strike of 1919 (primary and secondary documents).

External links

 

 
AFL–CIO
Canadian Labour Congress
International Federation of Chemical, Energy, Mine and General Workers' Unions
International Metalworkers' Federation
General unions
Trade unions established in 1942
1942 establishments in Ohio
Trade unions in Canada